Chilperic II (450–493 AD) was the King of Burgundy from 473 until his death. Before that he co-ruled with his father Gondioc beginning in 463. He began his reign in 473 after the partition of Burgundy with his younger brothers Godegisel, Gundobad, and Godomar; he ruled from Valentia Julia (Valence) and his brothers ruled respectively from Geneva, Vienne, and Lyon.

Sometime in the early 470s Chilperic was forced to submit to the authority of the Roman Empire by the magister militum Ecdicius Avitus. In 475 he probably sheltered an exiled Ecdicius after the Visigoths had obtained possession of the Auvergne.

After his brother Gundobad had removed his other brother Godomar (Gundomar) in 486, he turned on Chilperic. In 493 Gundobad assassinated Chilperic and drowned his wife, then exiled their two daughters, Chroma, who became a nun, and Clotilde, who fled to her uncle, Godegisel. When the Frankish king, Clovis I, requested the latter's hand in marriage, Gundobad was unable to decline. Clovis and Godegisel allied against Gundobad in a long, drawn-out civil war.

Sources
 The abridged translation of Gregory of Tour's History of the Franks made by Earnest Brehaut in 1916.

Kings of the Burgundians
450 births
493 deaths
5th-century monarchs in Europe